Khushi Ek Roag (or Khushi Aik Roag) is a 2012 Pakistani drama serial. Serial is broadcasting on ARY Digital since 11 June 2012. It is directed by Mohsin Mirza and written by Seema Munaf, starring Yumna Zaidi, Shahood Alvi, Farhan Ally Agha, Naheed Shabbir and Sami Khan.

Plot 
The characters portrayed by Shahood Alvi and Naheed Shabbir adopt a girl (played by Yumna Zaidi). When Shahood's father learns of this adoption, he is enraged, and cuts all ties with him. Soon afterwards, their neighbors also adopt a son (played by Sami Khan).

The children eventually learn they are adopted. Yumna tries to find her real parents, and finds them. She learns that they (played by Saleem Iqbal and Kanwal Nazar) gave her away because they were poor and had three other daughters to support.

Her adoptive mother dies, after which she goes back to her real parents.

Cast 
 Yumna Zaidi
 Shahood Alvi
 Farhan Ally Agha
 Naheed Shabbir
 Jahanara Hai
 Sami Khan
 Muhammad Faizan
Qaiser Naqvi
 Agha Shiraz
 Saleem Iqbal

References

External links 

ARY Digital original programming
2012 Pakistani television series debuts
Urdu-language television shows
Pakistani drama television series
A&B Entertainment